Golf was one of the many sports which was held at the 1998 Asian Games in Alpine Golf and Sports Club, Pathum Thani Province, Thailand between 10 and 13 December 1998.

Medalists

Medal table

References 
 Results

External links 
 Olympic Council of Asia

 
1998 Asian Games events
1998
Asian Games